Ruairí Dunbar (born 1987) is an Irish sportsperson.  He plays hurling with the Carlow senior inter-county hurling team. He won Christy Ring Cup titles with Carlow in 2008 and 2009.

Unnamed sources have claimed that Ruairí has been offered the managers role for Clare hurling. However he turned this down stating his undying loyalty to Carlow.

In 2007 Henry Shefflin stated "I wish I could hurl as well as Ruairí".

Ruairí was elected to the team of the decade from 2000 - 2010

References

1987 births
Living people
Carlow Town hurlers
Carlow inter-county hurlers